The 2009 Mercedes Cup was a man's tennis tournament played on outdoor clay courts. It was the 32nd edition of the Stuttgart Open and was part of the ATP World Tour 250 series of the 2009 ATP World Tour. It was held at the Tennis Club Weissenhof in Stuttgart, Germany, from 11 July 11 until 19 July 2009. Jérémy Chardy won the singles title.

ATP entrants

Seeds

Seedings are based on the rankings of July 6, 2009.

Other entrants
The following players received wildcards into the singles main draw

  Simon Greul
  Stefan Koubek
  Michael Berrer

The following players received entry from the qualifying draw:
  Łukasz Kubot
  Pablo Andújar
  Daniel Muñoz-de la Nava
  Dominik Meffert

Finals

Singles

 Jérémy Chardy defeated  Victor Hănescu, 1–6, 6–3, 6–4
It was Chardy's first career title.

Doubles

 František Čermák /  Michal Mertiňák defeated  Victor Hănescu /  Horia Tecău, 7–5, 6–4

References

External links
Official website

Stuttgart Open
Stuttgart Open
2009 in German tennis